Kauranen is a Finnish surname. Notable people with the surname include:

 Jooseppi Kauranen (1880–1935), Finnish farmer and politician
 , Finnish professor of chemistry
 August Kuusisto (1883–1972), surname until 1920 Kauranen, Finnish farmer and politician
 Anja Snellman (born 1954), née Kauranen, Finnish author

Finnish-language surnames